Soyuz 17  (Union 17) was the first of two long-duration missions to the Soviet Union's Salyut 4 space station in 1975. The flight by cosmonauts Aleksei Gubarev and Georgy Grechko set a Soviet mission-duration record of 29 days, surpassing the 23-day record set by the ill-fated Soyuz 11 crew aboard Salyut 1 in 1971.

Crew

Backup crew

Reserve crew

Mission parameters 
Mass: 
Perigee: 
Apogee: 
Inclination: 51.6°
Period: 91.7 minutes

Mission highlights 
Salyut 4 was launched 26 December 1974, and Soyuz 17, with cosmonauts Georgy Grechko and Aleksei Gubarev as its first crew, was launched 16 days later on 10 January 1975. Gubarev manually docked Soyuz 17 to the station on 12 January 1975, and upon entering the new station he and Grechko found a note from its builders which said, "Wipe your feet"!

Salyut 4 was in an unusually high circular orbit of  when Soyuz 17 docked with the station. Salyut designer Konstantin Feoktistov said this was to ensure propellant consumption would be half of what was needed for lower-altitude Salyuts.

The crew worked between 15 and 20 hours a day, including their 2 hour exercise period. One of their activities included testing communication equipment for tracking ships and contacting mission control via a Molniya satellite. Astrophysics was a major component of the mission, with the station's solar telescope activated on 16 January 1975. The crew later discovered that the main mirror of the telescope had been ruined by direct exposure to sunlight when the pointing system failed. They resurfaced the mirror on 3 February 1975 and worked out a way of pointing the telescope using a stethoscope, stopwatch, and the noises the moving mirror made in its casing.

On 14 January 1975, a ventilation hose was set up from Salyut 4 to keep the Soyuz ventilated while its systems were shut down. On 19 January 1975, it was announced that ion sensors were being used to orient the station, a system described as being more efficient. A new teleprinter was used for communications from the ground crew, freeing the Salyut crew from constant interruptions during their work.

The cosmonauts began powering down the station on 7 February 1975 and they returned to Earth in the Soyuz capsule two days later, on 9 February 1975. They safely landed near Tselinograd in a snowstorm with winds of 72 km/h and wore gravity suits to ease the effects of re-adaptation.

Soyuz-17 Cliff in Antarctica is named after the mission.

References 

Crewed Soyuz missions
1975 in the Soviet Union
Spacecraft launched in 1975
Spacecraft which reentered in 1975
Spacecraft launched by Soyuz rockets